Local elections in Tacloban were held on May 13, 2013, within the Philippine general election. The voters elected candidates for the elective local posts in the city: the mayor, vice mayor, and ten councilors.

There were 109,027 registered voters in the city for the elections, and 92,163 of them voted, giving a voter turnout of 84.53%.

Background 
Incumbent Tacloban City Mayor Alfred Romualdez filed to run for his third and final term as Mayor. He and his wife Cristina, an incumbent city councilor running for reelection, filed their respective certificates of candidacy on October 4, 2012. They ran under the Nacionalista Party. An Waray partylist Representative Florencio Gabriel Noel, who is term-limited, filed his certificate of candidacy to challenge Romualdez on October 3, 2012. He ran as an independent. His candidacy was supported by the administration of President Benigno Aquino III, with presidential sister Kris Aquino going to the city to personally campaign for him. Meanwhile, Nacionalista Party president and former Senate President Manny Villar, as well as senators Bongbong Marcos and Alan Peter Cayetano, endorsed partymate Mayor Romualdez and his slate.

Representative Noel's running mate was incumbent Vice Mayor Jose Arvin Antoni of the Liberal Party. Incumbent councilor Jerry "Sambo" Yaokasin, who is term-limited, ran for Vice Mayor as an independent.

Results 
The candidates for mayor and vice mayor with the highest number of votes wins the seat; they are voted separately, therefore, they may be of different parties when elected.

This election is notable for being the first time a transgender woman was elected in the city council. Jose Mario "Jom" Bagulaya placed 7th in the city council race, garnering 37,381 votes.

Note that full results are unavailable and figures are for the winning candidates only.

Mayoral Election 
Parties are as stated in their certificate of candidacies. Alfred Romualdez is the incumbent.

Vice Mayoral Election 
Parties are as stated in their certificate of candidacies. Jose Arvin Antoni is the incumbent.

City Council Election 
Voters elected ten councilors to comprise the City Council or the Sangguniang Panlungsod. Candidates are voted for separately so winning candidates may come from different political parties. The ten candidates with the highest number of votes win the seats. For the tickets, names that are italicized were incumbents seeking reelection.

I Love Tacloban Slate

Bag-o nga Tacloban 12-0 Slate 

|-bgcolor=black
|colspan=5|

References

External links 

 Official website of the Commission on Elections
 Official website of National Movement for Free Elections (NAMFREL)
 Official website of the Parish Pastoral Council for Responsible Voting (PPCRV)
 2013 City or Municipality Election Results - Region VIII (Eastern Visayas)

2013 Philippine local elections
Elections in Leyte (province)
Tacloban